The Baton Rouge Riverbats (2003) or Baton Rouge River Bats (2002) was a baseball team based in Baton Rouge, Louisiana. They played their home games at Pete Goldsby Field in Baton Rouge.

History
This was the second stint of a professional baseball team in Baton Rouge since 1976. In 2002, they were one of six original members of the Southeastern League.

The 2003 team finished with a record of 38-31 (.551) and won the Southeastern League Championship against the Pensacola Pelicans. The team disbanded after the 2003 season along with the Southeastern League.

Notable players
Steve Bourgeois
Seth Thibodeaux
Jason Williams
John Henry Williams

References

 

Professional baseball teams in Louisiana
Defunct independent baseball league teams
Defunct Southeastern League teams
Defunct minor league baseball teams
Baseball teams established in 2002
Baseball teams disestablished in 2003
2002 establishments in Louisiana
2003 disestablishments in Louisiana
Southeastern League teams
Defunct baseball teams in Louisiana